João Luis de Almeida (born 1961) was a boxer from Angola. He represented his country at the 1980 Summer Olympics in Moscow, Soviet Union. He competed in the Men's Bantamweight (54 kg) division. He received a bye during round one of the competition but lost in round 2 on points (0-5) to British boxer Ray Gilbody.

1980 Olympic results
Below is the record of João Luis de Almeida, an Angolan bantamweight boxer who competed at the 1980 Moscow Olympics:

 Round of 64: bye
 Round of 32: lost to Ray Gilbody (Great Britain) by decision, 0–5

See also
 Angola at the 1980 Summer Olympics

References

External links
 

1961 births
Living people
Olympic boxers of Angola
Boxers at the 1980 Summer Olympics
Angolan male boxers
Bantamweight boxers